Persida stands for Persatuan Sepakbola Indonesia Sidoarjo (en: Football Association of Indonesia Sidoarjo). Persida Sidoarjo is an  Indonesian football club based in Sidoarjo, East Java. They compete in Liga 3. Their home ground is Gelora Delta Stadium, which is situated in downtown Sidoarjo, East Java.

References

External links
Persida Sidoarjo at Liga-Indonesia.co.id

Sidoarjo Regency
Football clubs in East Java
Football clubs in Indonesia
Association football clubs established in 1963
1963 establishments in Indonesia